Princess Hedwig of Denmark (5 August 1581 – 26 November 1641) was the youngest daughter of King Frederick II of Denmark and Sophie of Mecklenburg-Güstrow, and Electress of Saxony from 1602 to 1611 as the wife of Christian II. The marriage was childless, and her husband was succeeded by his brother John George. After Christian's death in 1611, the Dowager Electress Hedwig held a powerful position in Saxony.

Early life and marriage 

Hedwig was born on 5 August 1581 at Frederiksborg Palace in Denmark, the seventh child and fourth daughter of King Frederick II of Denmark and Sophie of Mecklenburg-Güstrow. One of her three sisters was Princess Anne of Denmark, future queen of England and Scotland, and one of her brothers became Christian IV of Denmark. Like her siblings, she spent most of her childhood away from Denmark: in her case with her mother's relative in Mecklenburg.

She was married on 12 September 1602 to Christian II, Elector of Saxony, her first cousin once removed, in Dresden. The nine-year marriage was childless. Christian died in Dresden on 23 June 1611.

Life as Dowager Electress 

When her husband died in 1611, Hedwig became Dowager Electress in charge of the police and courts. She shared her authority with the new Elector, but her subjects considered her their sovereign. She was able to maintain her independence from her brother-in-law when it came to trade and commerce. She acted independently, granting letters of free passage etc., something that was normally the prerogative of the Elector. She founded churches and aided the poor, sick, and disabled.

In May 1612 she was a godparent to Christian Albert, the short-lived eldest son of John George, Elector of Saxony, and Duchess Magdalene Sibylle of Prussia.

As sister of the Danish King Christian IV and sister-in-law of  King James I of England, she cultivated important connections for her brother-in-law, Elector John George I, and was involved in arranging the marriages of five of his seven children. Because of her position and connections, her territories were hardly attacked during the Thirty Years' War.

As a widow, she mainly lived in Lichtenburg, but she visited Denmark on her mother's funeral in 1631 and at the wedding of her nephew Christian, Prince-Elect of Denmark  in 1634.

She died on 26 November 1641 at Schloss Lichtenburg in Prettin.

Ancestry

References

External links 

|-

1581 births
1641 deaths
Danish princesses
House of Oldenburg in Denmark
Norwegian princesses
Electresses of Saxony
Albertine branch
Burials at Freiberg Cathedral
Daughters of kings